Emanuil G. Gavriliță (11 August 1847 in Nicorești – 10 June 1910 in Băxani) was a lawyer, journalist and activist from Bessarabia. He was the director of Basarabia, a newspaper from Chișinău.

References

Honours 
 Căminul Cultural județean "Emanuil Gavriliță", Soroca

Bibliography 
 Poștarencu, Dinu. Emanuil Gavriliță: 90 de ani de la moarte (Contribuții biografice) (Emanuil Gavriliță - 90 ans deppuis sa mort). In: D Rom., 2000, 7, nr. 1, p. 49-54.
 Ştefan Ciobanu, Cultura românească în Basarabia sub stăpânirea rusă, Chişinău, 1923.
 Vocea Basarabiei, (AUDIO) Avocatul Emanuil Gavriliţă - ostaş al cetăţii dreptăţii
 Capitala, Avocatul Emanuil Gavriliță - ostaş al cetăţii dreptăţii
 Colesnic, Iurie, „Emanuil Gavriliță”, în Basarabia necunoscută. Vol. 1, Editura Universitas, Chișinău, 1993,

External links 
 Epoca Emanuil Gavriliță
 Crâmpeie documentare despre fotograful românităţii Samoilă Mârza

1847 births
1910 deaths
People from Bessarabia Governorate
Moldovan journalists
Male journalists
Romanian journalists
Moldovan politicians
Romanian writers
Moldovan writers
Moldovan male writers